Kajal Ahmad (born 1967) is a contemporary Kurdish poet and journalist, known for the show Dijebaw on Kurdsat. She started writing poetry in 1987.

About
Ahmad was born in Kirkuk in 1967 of Kurdish ancestry. She began writing poetry in 1986, and publishing it at the age of 21.  Her poems, are known for being "fierce" and "sensual", and have gained a reputation for "brave, poignant and challenging work throughout the Kurdish-speaking world." They have been translated into Arabic, Persian, Turkish, Norwegian and English. The English-language Handful of Salt, a translated collection, was released in 2016 by Word Works.

Kajal's lifestyle attracted criticism in conservative. She refused to wear the veil and wrote about a conservative culture that restricted women's life choices and the contradictions inherent in her homeland's cultural norms. Although men were attracted to her, they did not offer commitment, and women avoided her to the point where she felt isolated and lonely.

In addition to writing poetry, she also works as a journalist where she is able to write social commentary and analysis, particularly women's issues and politics. Ahmad was Editor-in-Chief of کوردستانی نوێ ( https://knwe.org), the daily newspaper of the Patriotic Union of Kurdistan for more than ten years. She has also hosted programs on Kurdsat. Her writings demonstrate her commitment to preserving Kurdish culture, the liberation of Kurdistan and to gender equality.

Along with a handful of female Kurdish poets and writers, including Najiba Ahmad (b. 1954), she is regarded as contributing to the development of Kurdish literature.

She lives and works in Sulaimaniya, Iraq.

Works

Her poetry is embedded in Kurdish traditions, and her subject matter deals with themes of exile, isolation, homeland and conflicting emotions. She has published seven books of poetry, and her work is also included in anthologies of important Iraqi poets. 
▪ Benderî Bermoda, 1999.

▪ Wutekanî Wutin, 1999.

▪ Qaweyek le gel ev da, 2001.

▪ Awênem şikand, 2004.

▪ "Diwanî Kajal Ahmad ", 2006 .    ‌  ‌

▪ Min Dibêt Xom Bismîl Bikem, 2014    ‌  ‌

▪Zmanî balndem dezanî 2019

▪ Erobringer, (2005) Kajal Ahmad booklet,translated to Norwegian by Hawdem Salih jaf, Inger Østenstad.
Publisher: Cappelen, Oslo [ 12]

▪ Kajal Ahmad Poems, translated to English by Mimi Khalvati and Choman Hardi (Enitharmon Press/Poetry Translation Centre, 2008).[13]

▪Qasaed tumtr narjsan (2008), Kajal Ahmad poems translated from Kurdish to Arabic. publisher Dar Almada/Damascus

▪ Handful of Salt, translated in to English by Alana Marie Levinson-LaBrosse, Mewan Nahro Said, Darya Abdul-Karim Ali Najm, Barbara Goldberg (The Word Works, 2016) [14]

See also
 Iraqi art
 List of Iraqi artists
 List of Iraqi women artists

References

 https://thelochravenreview.net/four-kurdish-poets-kajal-ahmad-sherko-bekas-abdulla-pashew-and-dlawar-qaradaghi/
 https://www.tanum.no/_erobringer-kajal-ahmad-9788202247621
https://poetrysociety.org/features/four-poems-by-kajal-ahmad-translated-from-the-kurdish
https://www.fairobserver.com/region/middle_east_north_africa/kurdistan-where-poets-are-more-than-poets-10687/
https://www.poetrytranslation.org/poets/kajal-ahmad
https://transcultures.fr/fr/lettres-kurdes/

Iraqi artists
Iraqi women artists
Kurdish poets
1967 births
Living people